East Enterprise is an unincorporated census-designated place in central Cotton Township, Switzerland County, in the U.S. state of Indiana. Although East Enterprise is unincorporated, it has a post office, with the ZIP code of 47019.

History
The post office at East Enterprise has been in operation since 1864, which established the current name of the community. Old variant names of the community include Allensville and Clapboard Corner.

Geography
The community lies at the intersection of State Roads 56 and 250 northeast of the town of Vevay, the county seat of Switzerland County.  Its elevation is 883 feet (269 m), and it is located at  (38.8728383, -84.9880062).

Demographics

According to the 2012-2016 American Community Survey, there are 155 housing units with a median housing value of $111,100 and a median housing income of $32,633. The male median income is $31,328 while the female median income is $25,694. Concurrently, 55.7% of the population lives in poverty, 75.1% have obtained a high school education, and 12.8% do not have health care. 1 military veteran resides within the community.

References

Census-designated places in Switzerland County, Indiana
Census-designated places in Indiana